Rolf Anders Michael Holmqvist Pedersen (born June 8, 1979) is a Swedish former professional ice hockey forward. He is the older brother of Djurgårdens IF player Andreas Holmqvist.

Playing career
Holmqvist was drafted 18th overall by the Mighty Ducks of Anaheim in the 1997 NHL Entry Draft from the SEL. After moving to the SM-liiga with TPS in 1999, Holmqvist made it to North America to start the 2003–04 season.

Michael only managed to play 21 games for the Ducks during the season, splitting time with affiliate, the Cincinnati Mighty Ducks of the American Hockey League. On July 30, 2005, Holmqvist was traded by the Ducks to the Chicago Blackhawks for Travis Moen. In the 2005–06 season, Michael enjoyed his best year, recording 10 goals and 20 points in 72 games played. Holmqvist played two full seasons with the Blackhawks before returning to the SEL in 2007. In total, Holmqvist played 156 regular season games, scoring 18 goals and 17 assists for 35 points while collecting 72 penalty minutes.

Career statistics

Regular season and playoffs

International

References

External links

 Holmqvist retires

1979 births
Anaheim Ducks draft picks
Chicago Blackhawks players
Cincinnati Mighty Ducks players
Djurgårdens IF Hockey players
Färjestad BK players
Frölunda HC players
Living people
Mighty Ducks of Anaheim players
National Hockey League first-round draft picks
Ice hockey people from Stockholm
Swedish expatriate ice hockey players in Finland
Swedish expatriate ice hockey players in the United States
Swedish ice hockey centres
HC TPS players